Elise Davis is an American country musician from Little Rock, Arkansas.

Career
Elise Davis began her career in 2016, releasing her first full-length album titled The Token. Davis released her second full-length album, Cactus, in September 2018.

In January 2021, Davis announced her third album titled Anxious. Happy. Chill., set for an April 16 release via Tone Tree Music.

Discography
Studio albums
The Token (2016, Make The Kill, Thirty Tigers)
Cactus (2018)
Anxious. Happy. Chill. (2021, Tone Tree)

References

Year of birth missing (living people)
Living people
Musicians from Little Rock, Arkansas
American country singer-songwriters
Country musicians from Arkansas
Singer-songwriters from Arkansas